Gay Barz is the debut extended play by American drag queen, Bob the Drag Queen, released on February 10, 2023.

Composition 
Kamera Tyme, Alix Milr, Mikey Angelo and Ocean Kelly are featured on the opening title track. Billboard has described "Take My Picture" as a "throbbing electro hip-hop banger". "Monét's Interlude" features drag performer Monét X Change.

Promotion 
The title track received a music video.

Track listing

References

External links
 

2023 debut EPs